Fumo di Londra (internationally released as Smoke Over London and Gray Flannels) is a 1966 Italian comedy film written, directed and starred by Alberto Sordi. For his performance Sordi won the David di Donatello for Best Actor.

Plot 
Dante Fontana is an antique dealer from Perugia infatuated with the culture of the British upper classes. His wife and relatives mock him and snub him, seeing him as a silly daydreamer doing no serious work. Unfussed, Dante plans a vacation to London to learn more about the culture he so admires. However, once in London, he struggles to fit in, is awkward, often makes mistakes betraying his Italian origins, attracting the scorn of the British upper classes he would like to impress. After taking part in fox hunting, Dante is invited to the house of an English aristocrat and showed a supposedly  ancient Etruscan statuette. Dante says the object is fake and breaks it, provoking the angry reaction of the English who open fire on him. Terrified, Dante hides with a group of hippies and joining them in a demonstration. Arrested, Dante is sent back to Italy where he resumes his monotonous routine.

Belvoir Castle was the location (as country-house of the Duchess of Bradford).

Cast 
Alberto Sordi as Dante Fontana
Fiona Lewis as  Elizabeth
Amy Dalby  as Duchess of Bradford 
Alfredo Marchetti as Count Bolla
Clara Bindi as The Wife
Michael Trubshawe as The Colonel
Jean St. Clair as Headmistress

References

External links
 

1966 films
Italian comedy films
1960s Italian-language films
English-language Italian films
Films directed by Alberto Sordi
Commedia all'italiana
1966 comedy films
Films scored by Piero Piccioni
Films set in London
1960s Italian films